"Life is Life" is a song by English folk band Noah and the Whale. The single served as the third single from the band's third studio album, Last Night on Earth. The single was released in the United Kingdom on 8 August 2011. It has so far peaked to number 172 on the UK Singles Chart.

Music video
The music video for the song appeared on their YouTube channel on 20 June 2011.

Track listing

Chart performance

Credits and personnel
Lead vocals – Noah and the Whale
Producers – Charlie Fink, Jason Lader
Lyrics –  Charlie Fink
Label: Mercury Records

Release history

References

2011 singles
Mercury Records singles
Noah and the Whale songs